Ba 'Alawi people belong to a group of Hadhrami Sayyid  families and social groups originating in Hadhramaut in the Arabian Peninsula, the Yemen republic in particular. The word Sadah or Sadat is a plural form of the Arabic word Sayyid ("Descendants of Muhammad"). The word Ba 'Alawi means descendants of Alwi.The hadhramis use the prefex "Baa" to mean the clan of.

Ba'alwi sada are descendants of the Islamic Prophet "Muhammad" through Alwi bin Ubaidillah bin Ahmad al-Muhajir. Al muhajir means the one who migrated. He migrated from Iraq due to political instability and settled in Huseisah, a village between Sey'un and Tarim in Yemen and that was in the year 318 A.H. Corresponding to 930 C.E.

Africa

Comoros 
 Umar bin Ahmad bin Abubakar bin Sumeyt, Scholar and saint, 1st Mufti of Comoros
 Said Toihir ben Said Ahmed Maoulana Jamal al layl, Scholar , 2nd Mufti of Comoros
 Aboubacar Said Abdillah Jamal al layl, Scholar  , 3rd Mufti of Comoros
 Said Ibrahim of Grand Comore, politician and son of Sultan of Grande Comore
 Fahmi Said Ibrahim, politician, son of Said Ibrahim and grandson of Sultan Said Ali
 Said Ali Kemal Eddine, politician, son of Said Ibrahim and grandson of Sultan Said Ali
 Said Ali bin Said Omar of Grande Comore, Sultan of Grande Comore
 Said Mohamed Djohar, President of Comoros during the 1990s
 Ahmed Abdallah, former President of the State of Comoros
 Ahmed Abdallah Mohamed Sambi, former President of Comoros
 Anrifat Nouria Attoumani Abdou Sidi Mouigni Mkuu, MZE ABDOU SOULE ELBAK's wife, President of Ngazidja (Comoros) (2001-2007)
 Saïd Mohamed Ben Chech Abdallah Cheikh, the head of the Government of Comoros from 1962 until his death in 1970.
 Said Achmet of Bambao,known as Mougné Mkou, Sultan of Bambao, he had more than 40 children, his descendants are present in Ngazidja, Anjouan, Zanzibar and elsewhere in the world
Sultan Hachim bin Sultan Ahmed Mougné Mkou, Sultan of Mbadjini and son of Said Achmet of Bambao

Kenya 
 
 Salih bin Alawi bin Abdallah Jamal al-Layl, religious scholar and Founder of The Riyadha Mosque in Lamu, Kenya
Habib Ali bin Abdallah Jamalulleyl, The uncle and teacher of Habib Salih
Habib Manswab Abubakar bin Abdurrahman Al huseini aal sheikh Abubakr bin Salim, A scholar and Qadhi (judge) 
Sharif Abdallah bin Said Al-beidh, the founder of Mambrui Maulid
 Habib Ahmad Badawy bin Salih bin Alawi Jamal al-Layl, religious scholar in Lamu, Kenya 
Habib Muhammad bin Omar Saqqaf
Sheykhul islam Habib Abdurrahman bin Ahmad Saqqaf, from siu, the former chief Kadhi of Kenya
Sayyid Omar Aidid
 Habib Ali bin Ahmad Badawy bin Salih Jamal al-layl,  religious scholar in Lamu, and the former chief kadhi of Kenya
Habib Said bin Abdallah bin Said Al-beidh
Habib Hasan Badawy Jamalulleyl
Al imam Muhammad bin Said bin Abdallah Albeidh, religious scholar in Mambrui, Kenya
Habib Abdulqadir bin Hasan bin Ismail Alhamid, Mombasa Kenya
Habib Ahmad Badawy bin Muhammad mwenye wa nana Alhuseiniy, Mombasa Kenya
Habib Muhammad bin Mustwafa Bunumei, Mombasa Kenya
Habib Hussein bin Ahmad bin Salih Jamal al-Layl, religious scholar in Lamu, Kenya 
Habib Muhammad bin Hasan Mwenyekarama Alnadhiry, Mombasa Kenya
Habib Ahmad bin Ahmad bin Salih Jamal al-Layl, Mufti of Kenya 
Abduswamad sharif nassir basakutah,Politician,  Governor  mombasa county, 2022-present

America

United States 

 Ahmad Fajri Alatas, a professor of History at New York University

Australia 
 Jai al-Attas, co-founder and co-owner of Australian independent label Below Par Records

Middle-east

UAE 
 Habib Ali al-Jifri, a cleric and scholar in UAE

Yemen 
 Abd Al-Rahman Ali al-Jufri, a Yemeni opposition politician
 Abdulaziz al-Saqqaf, a Yemeni human-rights activist, economist, and journalist
 Abdul-Wasa al-Saqqaf, a Yemeni writer, poet, researcher, analyst and translator
 Abdullah ibn Alawi al-Haddad, a Muslim patron saint
 Abu Bakr al-Aydarus, a Sufi saint
 Ahmad bin Isa Al-Muhajir, the progenitor of Ba'alawi family
 Haidar Abu Bakr al-Attas, former prime minister of Yemen
 Huda al-Attas, a Yemeni journalist and author 
 Muhammad al-Faqih al-Muqaddam, the founder of Ba 'Alawiyya Sufi order
 Umar bin Hafiz, an Islamic scholar, a cleric and founder of Darul Mustafa Seminary
 Abu Bakr Salem Belfkih, a famous Yemeni singer.
 Ali Salem al Beidh, president of the democratic republic of Yemen

Asia

Brunei Darussalam 
 Syed Mohammed Ar-Rayyan ibni Syed Abu Bakar Al Yaman, Arab-Malay conglomerate
 Syed Azhar Ar-Rayyan
 Syed Uzair Ar-Rayyan
 Sayyidah Aisyah binti Syed Uzair Ar-Rayyan
 Syed Rayyan Ar-Rayyan
 Syed Ezizi Rayyan Ar-Rayyan
 Syed Afifi Rayyan Ar-Rayyan
 Syed Ja'afari bin Syed Mashor, the father-in-law of Princess Majeedah Bolkiah of Brunei

India 
 General Ahmad El Edroos, a Major General and Commander-in-Chief of Hyderabad State Army

Indonesia 
 Abdullah bin Alwi Alatas, merchant
 Abdullah ibn Shaykh al-Aydarus, a religious leader in Aceh Sultanate
 Abdul Rahman Muazzam Shah of Johor, 16th Sultan of Johor and 1st Sultan of Riau-Lingga Sultanate
 Abdurrahman Az-Zahir, a Muslim leader during Aceh War 
 Abdurrahman Shihab, Indonesian academician, politician, and Qur'anic interpreter
 Ageng Tirtayasa of Banten, 6th Sultan of Banten Sultanate, National Hero of Indonesia
 Ahmad Albar, Indonesian rock star and founding member of God Bless
 Ahmad Fikri Assegaf, Indonesian lawyer
 Ahmad Taufik Al-Jufri, Indonesian newspaper journalist 
 Ali Alatas, former Foreign Minister of Indonesia
 Ali Alwi, Indonesian politician
 Ali bin Abdurrahman al-Habsyi, Indonesian preacher and cleric in Jakarta 
 Ali Shahab, Indonesian film director
 Alwi Shahab, Indonesian journalist and historian
 Alwi Shihab, former foreign minister of Indonesia and Special Envoy to Middle-East
 A.N. Alcaff, Indonesian actor and film director
 Badr ul-Alam Syarif Hasyim Jamaluddin, 18th Sultan of Aceh Sultanate
 Bahar bin Smith, Indonesian preacher
Fadel Muhammad al-Haddar, former minister of maritime affairs and fisheries of Indonesia
 Fatahillah, 16th-century commander for the Sultanate of Demak
 Haddad Alwi Assegaf, an Indonesian nasheed singer
 Haidar Bagir al-Habsyi, a scholar, founder, and CEO of Mizan Publishing Company
 Hamid Algadri, Indonesian author and politician
 Husein Aidid, Indonesian songwriter
 Husein Ja'far Al-Hadar, Indonesian philosopher and author
 Husein Mutahar, Indonesian music composer
 Idrus bin Salim al-Jufri, Indonesian Islamic scholar, founder of Alkhairaat
 Iqbal Assegaf, Indonesian political activist
 Mahdi Fahri Albaar, Indonesian footballer
 Mahmud Badaruddin II, Sultan of Palembang Sultanate, National Hero of Indonesia
Maulana Hasanuddin of Banten, 1st Sultan of Banten Sultanate
 Moeslim Taher, Indonesian education figures, founder of Jayabaya University
 Muchsin Alatas, singer
 Muhamad bin Salim Alatas, member of Jakarta DPRD
 Muhammad Alhamid, former Chairman of Election Supervisory Board of Indonesia
 Muhammad bin Ali bin Yahya, Mufti of Kutai
Muhammad Luthfi bin Yahya, the chairman of Jam'iyyah Ahli Thariqah al-Mu'tabarah al-Nahdliyah (JATMAN)
 Muhammad Rifky, Indonesian actor, and footballer
 Muhammad Rizieq Shihab, founder of Islamic Defenders Front
 Munzir Al-Musawa, founder of Majelis Rasulullah
Omar Daniel, Indonesian actor
 Quraish Shihab, former Minister of Religious Affairs of the Republic of Indonesia 
 Raden Saleh, a famous painter in Dutch Indies 
 Radin Inten II, National Hero of Indonesia
 Saggaf bin Muhammad Aljufri, Indonesian Islamic scholar
 Said Agil Husin Al Munawar, former Minister of Religious Affairs of the Republic of Indonesia 
 Said Assagaff, Governor of Maluku 
 Salim bin Djindan, a famous cleric and preacher in Jakarta
 Salim Segaf Al-Jufri, former minister of Social Affairs of the Republic of Indonesia
 Shaleh Muhamad Aldjufri, Senator of the Republic of Indonesia from Central Sulawesi
 Syarif Ali bin Syekhabubakar, a prince in Palembang Sultanate 
 Syarif Hamid II of Pontianak, Sultan of Pontianak Sultanate
 Syarif Kasim II of Siak, 12th Sultan of Siak Sri Indrapura Sultanate
 Syarif Saiful Alam Syah, 30th Sultan of Aceh Sultanate, son of Tuanku Sayyid Husain Aidid
 Syech Albar, Indonesian gambus singer
Tsamara Alatas, politician
 Umay Shahab, Indonesian actor
 Usman bin Yahya, Mufti of Batavia
 Veve Zulfikar, nashid singer
 Yusra Alhabsyi, politician
 Zulfikar Mohammad Basyaiban, Indonesian qāriʾ

Malaysia 
 Alwi bin Thohir al-Haddad, Mufti of Johor
 Syarif Masahor, a Malaysian Warrior
 Mahmud Shah III of Johor, 15th Sultan and Yang di-Pertuan Besar of Johor and Pahang and their dependencies, National Hero of Indonesia
 Sayyid Abdullah Al-Aidarus, religious leader
 Syed Sheh Hassan Barakbah, a prominent judge in Malaysia
 Syed Hamid al-Bar, politician and former Malaysian Minister of Home Affairs
 Putra of Perlis, a Sultan of Perlis State in Malaysia
 Syed Hussein Alatas, a Malaysian academician, sociologist, founder of social science organizations
 Syed Muhammad Naquib al-Attas, a Muslim scholar
 Syed Hussein Alatas, Malaysian academic, sociologist and politician and the older brother of Syed Muhammad Naquib al-Attas
 Syed Farid al-Attas, Malaysian sociologist and the son of Syed Hussein Alatas

Singapore 
 Abu Bakar bin Taha, a well-known Islamic educator in Singapore
 Mohammed Abdullah Alhabshee, first gentleman of Singapore
 Syed Mohamed Alsagoff, a Singaporean merchant
 Syed Mohamed Syed Ahmad al-Saqqaf, major-general of Singapore military
 Alkaff family, a wealthy and influential family during British ruling

References 

Baalawi
Hadhrami people
Hashemite people